Vasu Kola (also Romanized as Vāsū Kolā; also known as Asū Kolā) is a village in Siyahrud Rural District, in the Central District of Juybar County, Mazandaran Province, Iran. At the 2006 census, its population was 1,119, in 275 families.

References 

Populated places in Juybar County